Bertille-Mallorie Ali (born April 22, 1982 in Bangui) is a judoka from the Central African Republic, who competed in the women's extra-lightweight category. Ali qualified as a lone judoka for the Central African squad in the women's extra-lightweight class (48 kg) at the 2004 Summer Olympics in Athens, by placing third and receiving a berth from the African Qualification Tournament in Casablanca, Morocco. She lost her opening match to Algeria's Soraya Haddad, who successfully scored an ippon and threw her down the tatami with a kuchiki taoshi (single leg takedown) assault at one minute and twenty-seven seconds.

References

External links

1982 births
Living people
Central African Republic female judoka
Olympic judoka of the Central African Republic
Judoka at the 2004 Summer Olympics
People from Bangui